The Dirty South or Dirty South may refer to:

Southern United States, a geographic and cultural region of the United States
Dirty South (musician) (born 1978), Serbian-Australian electro house DJ and producer
Southern hip hop, also called Dirty South, a style of hip hop music perhaps embodied by the 1996 Goodie Mob song "Dirty South"
The Dirty South (album), a 2004 album by Drive-By Truckers
Dirty South (album), an album by Rasheeda
Party Down South, also called Dirty South, an American reality television series